The Battle of Arakere was a battle fought near the Mysorean capital city of Seringapatam on 15 May 1791 during the Third Anglo-Mysore War.  An army led by Charles, Earl Cornwallis consisting of British East India Company and British Army forces, along with allied forces from the Nizam of Hyderabad, arrived near Seringapatam, and sought a crossing of the Kaveri River near the village of Arakere.  Tipu Sultan, Mysore's ruler, had established a defensive line there, and Cornwallis, in an attack begun early on 15 May, drove Tipu from his position.  Tipu retreated into Seringapatam; Cornwallis, whose army was running out of food, fought Tipu's forces and were defeated in a decisive battle. The British forces then retreated to Bangalore after the battle.

References

History of the Madras Army, Volume 2

Marshman, John Clark (1863). The history of India

Arakere
Arakere 1791
Arakere 1791
Arakere 1791
Arakere
History of Karnataka
1791 in India